Aziliz Divoux (born 3 January 1995) is a Belgian-French female volleyball player. She was part of the Belgium women's national volleyball team.

She participated in the 2015 FIVB Volleyball World Grand Prix, and in the 2016 FIVB Volleyball World Grand Prix. On club level she played for VDK Gent Dames in 2015.

References

External links
http://www.scoresway.com/?sport=volleyball&page=player&id=9986
http://worldgrandprix.2016.fivb.com/en/group1/competition/teams/bel-belgium/players/aziliz-divoux?id=51493
http://worldgrandprix.2015.fivb.com/en/preliminary-round-group1/competition/teams/bel-belgium/players/aziliz-divoux?id=44676
 

1995 births
Living people
Belgian women's volleyball players
Place of birth missing (living people)
Setters (volleyball)